Toecorhychia is a genus of moths of the family Yponomeutidae.

Species
Toecorhychia cinerea - Butler, 1883 

Yponomeutidae